Mount Direction is a locality and small rural community in the local government areas of Launceston and George Town, in the Launceston and North-east regions of Tasmania. The Tamar River forms a small section of the south-western boundary. The 2016 census determined a population of 246 for the state suburb of Mount Direction.

Road infrastructure
The C809 route (Dalrymple Road) intersects with the East Tamar Highway in the south-west of the locality, passing through from south to north and providing access to many other localities.

References

Localities of City of Launceston
Localities of George Town Council
Towns in Tasmania